Protein S (also known as PROS) is a vitamin K-dependent plasma glycoprotein synthesized in the liver. In the circulation, Protein S exists in two forms: a free form and a complex form bound to complement protein C4b-binding protein (C4BP). In humans, protein S is encoded by the PROS1 gene. Protein S plays a role in coagulation.

History
Protein S is named for Seattle, Washington, where it was originally discovered and purified by Earl Davie's group in 1977.

Structure
Protein S is partly homologous to other vitamin K-dependent plasma coagulation proteins, such as protein C and factors VII, IX, and X. Similar to them, it has a Gla domain and several EGF-like domains (four rather than two), but no serine protease domain. Instead, there is a large C-terminus domain that is homologous to plasma steroid hormone-binding proteins such as sex hormone-binding globulin and corticosteroid-binding globulin. It may play a role in the protein functions as either a cofactor for activated protein C (APC) or in binding C4BP.

Additionally, protein S has a peptide between the Gla domain and the EGF-like domain, that is cleaved by thrombin. The Gla and EGF-like domains stay connected after the cleavage by a disulfide bond. However, protein S loses its function as an APC cofactor following either this cleavage or binding C4BP.

Function
The best characterized function of Protein S is its role in the anti coagulation pathway, where it functions as a cofactor to Protein C in the inactivation of Factors Va and VIIIa. Only the free form has cofactor activity.

Protein S binds to negatively charged phospholipids via the carboxylated Gla domain. This property allows Protein S to facilitate the removal of cells that are undergoing apoptosis, a form of structured cell death used by the body to remove unwanted or damaged cells. In healthy cells, an ATP (adenosine triphosphate)-dependent enzyme removes negatively charged phospholipids such as phosphatidyl serine from the outer leaflet of the cell membrane. An apoptotic cell (that is, one undergoing apoptosis) no longer actively manages the distribution of phospholipids in its outer membrane and hence begins to display negatively charged phospholipids on its exterior surface. These negatively charged phospholipids are recognized by phagocytes such as macrophages. Protein S binds to the negatively charged phospholipids and functions as a bridge between the apoptotic cell and the phagocyte. This bridging expedites phagocytosis and allows the cell to be removed without giving rise to inflammation or other signs of tissue damage.

Protein S does not bind to the nascent complement complex C5,6,7 to prevents it from inserting into a membrane.  This is a different complement protein S AKA vitronectin made by the VTN gene, not to be confused with the coagulation protein S made by the PROS gene which this wiki page concerns.

Pathology

Mutations in the PROS1 gene can lead to Protein S deficiency which is a rare blood disorder which can lead to an increased risk of thrombosis.

Interactions
Protein S has been shown to interact with Factor V.

See also
 Hemostasis

References

Further reading

Coagulation system